Neopentyl alcohol is a compound with formula (CH3)3CCH2OH. It is a colorless solid. The compound is one of the eight isomers of pentyl alcohol.

Preparation and reactions
Neopentyl alcohol can be prepared from the hydroperoxide of diisobutylene.
It can also be prepared by the reduction of trimethylacetic acid with lithium aluminum hydride.  
Neopentyl alcohol was the first described in 1891 by L. Tissier, who prepared it by reduction of a mixture of trimethyl acetic acid and trimethylacetyl chloride with sodium amalgam.

Neopentyl alcohol can be converted to neopentyl iodide by treatment with triphenylphosphite/methyl iodide:
(CH3)3CCH2OH  +  [CH3(C6H5O)3P]+I− →   (CH3)3CCH2I  +  [CH3(C6H5O)2PO  +  C6H5OH

See also
 Pentaerythritol
 Neopentyl glycol
 Trimethylolethane
 Trimethylolpropane

References

Alcohol solvents
Primary alcohols
Alkanols
Tert-butyl compounds